The 1920 Giro di Lombardia was the 16th edition of the Giro di Lombardia cycle race and was held on 9 November 1920. The race started and finished in Milan. The race was won by Henri Pélissier.

General classification

References

1920
Giro di Lombardia
Giro di Lombardia